Českomoravská is a Prague Metro station on Line B. It was opened on 22 November 1990 as the eastern terminus of the extension from Florenc. It is under Drahobejlova street in Libeň. Českomoravská remained a terminal station until the extension of Line B to Černý Most on 8 November 1998.

There is one exit through an escalator tunnel. An adjacent bus station serves as terminal for some urban and suburban lines in the northeast of Prague. The multifunctional O2 arena, formerly Sazka Arena, built in 2004, is next to the Českomoravská station. The shopping center  is also in the immediate vicinity of the station.

Zápotockého was the originally intended name for this station (after Czech communist politician Antonín Zápotocký), but this idea was abandoned after the Velvet Revolution in 1989. The current name Českomoravská (literally: Bohemo-Moravian) derives from the large Českomoravská Kolben-Daněk engineering company, once based nearby.

References

External links
 Českomoravská at metroweb.cz 

Prague Metro stations
Railway stations opened in 1990
1990 establishments in Czechoslovakia
Railway stations in the Czech Republic opened in the 20th century